St. Augustine College is a private college in Chicago, Illinois.  It was the first bilingual institution of higher education in Illinois. It was founded on October 7, 1980, under the auspices of the Episcopal Diocese of Chicago. The founding of a college was the culmination of ten years of work by Spanish Episcopal Services and Father Carlos A. Plazas, Ph.D.

Academics
 
St. Augustine College is accredited by the Higher Learning Commission and offers bachelor's degrees in Business Administration, Psychology, Hospitality Management, Computer Information Systems and Social Work. Associate degrees in Child Development, Interdisciplinary, Psychology
Social Service, Spanish, Computer Information Systems, Criminal Justice, Accounting, Administrative Assistant, Business Management, Computer Information Systems, Culinary Arts
Early Childhood Education, Respiratory Therapy, and General Studies. St. Augustine College's Social Work program is accredited by the Council on Social Work Education’s Commission.

The college currently has roughly 1,000 students attending the school. St. Augustine College offers 14 degree programs at both the associates and bachelors level. 
The approximate tuition rate for St. Augustine is $13,200 per academic year.

References

External links
Official website

Universities and colleges in Chicago
Educational institutions established in 1980
Bilingual schools
Universities and colleges affiliated with the Episcopal Church (United States)
Private universities and colleges in Illinois